Tommaso Milanese (born 31 July 2002) is an Italian professional footballer who plays as a midfielder for  club Venezia, on loan from Cremonese.

Club career 
After moving his first footsteps as part of Fabrizio Miccoli's youth academy, Milanese was scouted and signed by Roma in 2016.

He signed his first professional contract in November 2018, before renewing it the following summer.

Tommaso Milanese made his professional debut for Roma on 5 November 2020 in the UEFA Europa League, coming on as a substitute against CFR Cluj. He provided an assist for Roma's fifth goal of the game. On 10 December, Milanese scored his first goal for Roma in a 1–3 away loss against CSKA Sofia in the Europa League.

On 25 August 2021, Milanese joined newly-promoted Serie B side Alessandria on a season-long loan deal.

On 2 July 2022, Milanese moved to Cremonese. On 31 January 2023, he was loaned by Venezia.

References

External links

2002 births
21st-century Italian people
Sportspeople from the Province of Lecce
Footballers from Apulia
Living people
Italian footballers
Italy youth international footballers
Association football midfielders
A.S. Roma players
U.S. Alessandria Calcio 1912 players
U.S. Cremonese players
Venezia F.C. players
Serie A players
Serie B players